Gambolò (Lombard: Gambulò) is a comune (municipality) in the Province of Pavia in the Italian region Lombardy, located about  southwest of Milan and about  northwest of Pavia.

Gambolò borders the following municipalities: Borgo San Siro, Mortara, Tromello, Vigevano. Sights include the Litta Castle, the parish church of Sts. Eusebius and Gaudentius (in neo-medieval style) and the Pieve of Sant'Eusebio.

Twin towns
 Kyrros, Greece
 Mālpils, Latvia

References

Cities and towns in Lombardy